Camille Danguillaume (4 June 1919 – 26 June 1950) was a French cyclist. He won Liège–Bastogne–Liège in 1949. He rode in the 1947, 1948 and 1949 Tour de France.  He died of a fracture to the temporal bone four days after colliding with two motorcycles at the 1950 French National Road Championships at Montlhéry. He was the uncle of fellow racing cyclist Jean-Pierre Danguillaume.

References

External links

1919 births
1950 deaths
French male cyclists
People from Châteaulin
Sportspeople from Finistère
Cyclists from Brittany